The Ollo people, also known as the Lazu Naga, are a Tibeto-Burman ethnic group mostly resides in the Northeast Indian state of Arunachal Pradesh and some in the Naga Self-Administered Zone in Myanmar. They inhabit 12 villages under Lazu circle in Tirap district. However, due to lack of official recognition from Government of Arunachal Pradesh they are considered a subgroup of ethnic Nocte people.

Festival
They celebrate "Woraang" festival.
It is one of the colorful festivals of India.

References

Naga people
Ethnic groups in Northeast India